Luis Rafael Alvarado Constenla (born 29 November 1940) is a Chilean politician who served as minister of State under Patricio Aylwin's government (1994–2000). He also served as ambassador of Chile to Cuba.

References

1940 births
Living people
Chilean people
Socialist Party of Chile politicians
Party for Democracy (Chile) politicians
University of Chile alumni
Pontifical Catholic University of Chile alumni